Lawlor is an Irish surname. It may refer to:

Arts and entertainment
Charlotte Lawlor (1878–1941), New Zealand poet, writer and advertising designer
Gerri Lawlor, American actress
 John Lawlor (sculptor) (1820–1901), Irish sculptor
 John Lawlor (actor), American actor
Mary Lawlor (actress) (1907–1977), American stage and screen actress
 Sean Lawlor (1954–2009), Irish actor and playwright
 Stephen Lawlor, Irish artist
 Thomas Lawlor (opera singer), British opera singer

Politics
 James Fintan Lalor (1807–1849), Irish revolutionary and writer
 Liam Lawlor (1945–2005), Irish politician
 Mike Lawlor, American politician and professor
 Patsy Lawlor (1933–1997), Irish politician
 Peter Lawlor (born 1948), Australian politician
 Thomas Lawlor (politician) (died 1945), Irish politician

Sport
 Jim Lawlor (hurler) (1878–?), Irish hurler
 Jimmy Lawlor (1933–2012), Irish footballer
 Kit Lawlor (1922–2004), Irish footballer
 Liam Lawlor (hurler) (born 1985), Irish hurler
 Mick Lawlor, Irish Gaelic footballer
 Mick Lawlor (footballer) (born 1949), Irish former footballer
 Mike Lawlor (baseball) (1854–1918), American baseball player
 Pat Lawlor (hurler), Irish retired hurler
 Paul Lawlor, Irish Gaelic footballer
 Peter Lawlor (hurler), Irish hurler
 Raymond Lawlor (1888-1946), American soccer player
 Tom Lawlor (born 1983), American mixed martial artist
 Tyler Lawlor (born 1972), Canadian slalom canoeist

Other
 Edward Lawlor (1907–1987), Church of the Nazarene minister
 James Fintan Lalor (1807–1849), Irish journalist and revolutionary
 Krista Lawlor, American philosopher
 Mary Lawlor (human rights advocate) (born 1952), Irish activist
 Pat Lawlor, American pinball machine designer
 Robbie Lawlor (Irish criminal) (died 2020), Irish criminal
 Robert Lawlor, anthropologist

See also
 Lawlor Island
 Lawlor Events Center
 Lalor
 O'Lawlor
 Lawler (disambiguation)

English-language surnames
Surnames of Irish origin